KSVE is an AM radio station licensed for 1650 kHz in El Paso, Texas. The station is currently owned by Entravision Communications. The station is currently carrying a Spanish sports format, and is branded TUDN Deportes.

History

KSVE originated as the "expanded band" twin to a standard AM band station. On March 17, 1997 the Federal Communications Commission (FCC) announced that eighty-eight stations had been given permission to move to newly available "Expanded Band" transmitting frequencies, ranging from 1610 to 1700 kHz, with KSVE (now KHRO) in El Paso authorized to move from 1150 to 1650 kHz. The expanded band station on 1650 kHz, also located in El Paso, was assigned the call letters KBIV on September 4, 1998. This call sign was changed to KHRO on February 25, 2005, and to KSVE on September 23, 2008.

The FCC initially provided that both the original station and its expanded band counterpart could optionally operate simultaneously for up to five years, after which owners would have to turn in one of the two licenses, depending on whether they preferred the new assignment or elected to remain on the original frequency. However, this deadline has been extended multiple times, and both stations have remained authorized. One restriction is that the FCC has generally required paired original and expanded band stations to remain under common ownership.

References

External links

Entravision Communications stations
Radio stations established in 1998
1998 establishments in Texas